Lincoln Park is a hamlet (and census-designated place) in Ulster County, New York, United States. The population was 2,545 at the 2020 census.

Lincoln Park is in the southern part of the Town of Ulster, adjacent to the northern city boundary  of the City of Kingston.

Demographics

At the 2000 census, there were 2,337 people, 1,064 households and 619 families residing in the CDP. The population density was 1,716.7 per square mile (663.5/km2). There were 1,114 housing units at an average density of 818.3/sq mi (316.3/km2). The racial makeup of the CDP was 93.37% White, 3.34% African American, 0.30% Native American, 1.50% Asian, 0.04% Pacific Islander, 0.30% from other races, and 1.16% from two or more races. Hispanic or Latino of any race were 2.57% of the population.

There were 1,064 households, of which 24.2% had children under the age of 18 living with them, 43.7% were married couples living together, 10.2% had a female householder with no husband present, and 41.8% were non-families. 36.7% of all households were made up of individuals, and 21.3% had someone living alone who was 65 years of age or older. The average household size was 2.18 and the average family size was 2.86.

20.6% of the population were under the age of 18, 6.7% from 18 to 24, 28.2% from 25 to 44, 21.4% from 45 to 64, and 23.2% who were 65 years of age or older. The median age was 42 years. For every 100 females there were 84.5 males. For every 100 females age 18 and over, there were 80.0 males.

The median household income was $34,583 and the median family income was $44,279. Males had a median income of $35,000 compared with $24,769 for females. The per capita income for the CDP was $19,863. About 10.2% of families and 12.9% of the population were below the poverty line, including 26.6% of those under age 18 and 13.4% of those age 65 or over.

References

Census-designated places in New York (state)
Census-designated places in Ulster County, New York
Hamlets in New York (state)
Hamlets in Ulster County, New York